A foreign currency mortgage is a mortgage which is repayable in a currency other than the currency of the country in which the borrower is a resident. Foreign currency mortgages can be used to finance both personal mortgages and corporate mortgages.

The interest rate charged on a Foreign currency mortgage is based on the interest rates applicable to the currency in which the mortgage is denominated and not the interest rates applicable to the borrower's own domestic currency. Therefore, a Foreign currency mortgage should only be considered when the interest rate on the foreign currency is significantly lower than the borrower can obtain on a mortgage taken out in his or her domestic currency.

Borrowers should bear in mind that ultimately they have a liability to repay the mortgage in another currency and currency exchange rates constantly change. This means that if the borrower's domestic currency was to strengthen against the currency in which the mortgage is denominated, then it would cost the borrower less in domestic currency to fully repay the mortgage. Therefore, in effect, the borrower makes a capital saving.

Conversely, if the exchange rate of borrowers domestic currency were to weaken against the currency in which the mortgage is denominated, then it would cost the borrower more in their domestic currency to repay the mortgage. Therefore, the borrower makes a capital loss.

When the value of the mortgage is large, it may be possible to reduce or limit the risk in the exchange exposure by hedging (see below).

Managed currency mortgages can help to reduce risk exposure. A borrower can allow a specialist currency manager to manage their loan on their behalf (through a limited power of attorney), where the currency manager will switch the borrower's debt in and out of foreign currencies as they change in value against the base currency. A successful currency manager will move the borrower's debt into a currency which subsequently falls in value against the base currency. The manager can then switch the loan back into the base currency (or another weakening currency) at a better exchange rate, thereby reducing the value of the loan. A further benefit of this product is that the currency manager will try to select currencies with a lower interest rate than the base currency, and the borrower therefore can make substantial interest savings.

There are risks associated with these types of mortgages and the borrower must be prepared to accept an (often limited) increase in the value of their debt if there are adverse movements in the currency markets.

A successful currency manager may be able to use the currency markets to pay off a borrower's loan (through a combination of debt reduction and interest rate savings) within the normal lifetime of the loan, while the borrower pays on an interest only basis.

A borrower can also choose from various products available at specialist money transfer providers e.g.; Forward Contracts and Currency options, where you can choose a future date for the transaction to take place. Both these products also allow a borrower to fix an exchange rate, which safeguards his money from the fluctuations in the currency market. Products facilitating ‘Regular Payment’ ensures that your mortgage payment is paid on the stipulated date as indicated by you thus preventing any default in payments.

See also
Hedge (finance)
Exchange rate
Foreign exchange market
Wire transfer

References

Mortgage